Zeeshan Khan may refer to:
 Zeeshan Khan (Multan cricketer) (born 1976), Pakistani cricketer
 Zeeshan Khan (Khyber Pakhtunkhwa cricketer) (born 1992), Pakistani cricketer
 Zeeshan Khan (squash player) (born 1997), Pakistani squash player